Steven Edward Duren (born September 4, 1956), better known by his stage name Blackie Lawless, is an American singer, songwriter and musician, best known as the lead singer and rhythm guitarist (formerly bassist) for heavy metal band W.A.S.P.

Early life 
Duren was born in Tampa, Florida, and raised in Staten Island, New York City. He had a fundamentalist Baptist upbringing, but has also claimed Jewish ancestry. 

He has said that he was "very active" in church as a youth and was born again at age 11. In his late teens, Duren strayed from the church and became interested in the occult. Although he would only study occultism for a short time before leaving that too, he continued to use themes of occultism up until his return to the Christian faith in recent years. 

He has Irish, French and Native American ancestry (his mother is one-quarter Blackfoot). He is the nephew of the late Major League Baseball pitcher, Ryne Duren. Lawless himself considered pursuing a professional baseball career; however, he ultimately opted for music. He credits his older brother with introducing him to the guitar.

Career 

Lawless began his career in music playing with bands such as Black Rabbit and Orfax Rainbow. In 1975, after Johnny Thunders left the glam rock band New York Dolls in the middle of a tour of Florida, the band started auditioning for guitarists. Lawless was hired but only stayed for the remainder of the tour.
After the tour, he went to California with bassist Arthur Kane and helped found Killer Kane. At that time, Lawless' stage name was "Blackie Goozeman" as stated on the back of Killer Kane's only EP. About a year later Kane returned to New York City but Lawless decided to stay in West Los Angeles. In 1976, he formed Sister, which also featured future W.A.S.P. guitarist Randy Piper. Around 1978, a new lineup was assembled which included Nikki Sixx as bassist and Lizzie Grey on guitar. Later, Chris Holmes joined.

Lawless later formed a band called Circus Circus in 1979, with Piper again appearing in the lineup. In 1981, following Circus Circus' failure, Lawless joined Lizzie Grey and Nikki Sixx's band London, with whom he played a few gigs and recorded two songs as demos, though by this time Sixx had already departed to form Mötley Crüe. In 1982, Lawless switched to bass guitar and along with Randy Piper formed W.A.S.P. The lineup was soon completed with Chris Holmes on lead guitar and Tony Richards on drums.

W.A.S.P. 

W.A.S.P. underwent numerous lineup changes, with Lawless being the last remaining original member and chief songwriter. Many of his songs tend to deal with religious or apocalyptic themes, due to his Christian upbringing. Lawless has stated in recent interviews that he has returned to the Christian faith and considers himself a born-again Christian.

Lawless cites influences which include AC/DC, Black Sabbath, the Beatles, Kiss, and Alice Cooper.

Lawless's stage theatrics are heavily influenced by Alice Cooper and Kiss, often imitating Gene Simmons and/or Paul Stanley during performances.

In the mid-1980s, W.A.S.P. faced controversy as Lawless spoke out in defense of heavy metal music against the Parents Music Resource Center after the band faced intense scrutiny for their single "Animal (F**k Like a Beast)".
Despite this, the band achieved their greatest success from 1985 to 1988, with several hit singles including "L.O.V.E. Machine", "I Wanna Be Somebody", and "Wild Child".

References

External links 

Official W.A.S.P. website
Blackie Lawless interview at 2010 Sleaze Roxx

Interview with Blackie Lawless: Helldorado at HardRadio.com
History of W.A.S.P. & Sister according to Randy Piper at Full In Bloom Music
Interview with DaBelly Magazine, 2000
Interview with Loudwire Magazine, 2018

1956 births
Christians from New York (state)
American heavy metal guitarists
American heavy metal singers
American male singers
Glam metal musicians
Living people
People from Staten Island
American people of Jewish descent
W.A.S.P. members
American multi-instrumentalists
American people of Blackfoot descent
American male guitarists
20th-century American guitarists
20th-century American male musicians
American Christians
American people of Irish descent
American people of French descent